The Diocese of Shreveport is a Latin Church ecclesiastical territory or diocese of the Catholic Church covering the parishes of northern Louisiana. The largest cities in the diocese are Shreveport, Monroe, Bossier City and Ruston. 

It is a suffragan diocese of the metropolitan Archdiocese of New Orleans. Its bishop is part of the United States Conference of Catholic Bishops and belongs to Conference Region V (which includes the diocese of Alabama, Kentucky, Louisiana, Mississippi, and Tennessee). Its mother church is the Cathedral of Saint John Berchmans, in Shreveport.

The total population was 784,665, out of which 39,436 (5 percent of the total population) were Catholic, served by 42 diocesan priests in 32 parishes, in 2004. In 2010, the diocese had eight seminarians preparing for ordination to the priesthood.

History
Pope John Paul II erected the Diocese of Shreveport on 16 June 1986, taking its present territory from the Diocese of Alexandria-Shreveport and simultaneously changing the title of the mother diocese back to Diocese of Alexandria, thus effectively splitting the mother diocese into two.  The pope designated the Cathedral of St. John Berchmans in Shreveport, until then the co-cathedral of the Diocese of Alexandria-Shreveport, as the cathedral church of the new diocese.

Sexual abuse
On July 19, 2020, it became public that the Diocese of Shreveport is a respondent in a lawsuit in which a male plaintiff said that the diocese had shielded a priest who sexually abused him in the 1970s.

Bishops
The list of ordinaries of the diocese and their years of service:
 William Benedict Friend (1986–2006)
 Michael Duca (2008–2018); appointed Bishop of Baton Rouge
 Francis Ignatius Malone (2020–present)

Coat of arms

High schools
 Loyola College Prep, Shreveport
 St. Frederick Catholic High School, Monroe

Media
The diocese publishes a monthly magazine, The Catholic Connection.

References

External links 
Roman Catholic Diocese of Shreveport Official Site

Roman Catholic Ecclesiastical Province of New Orleans
Christian organizations established in 1986
Culture of Shreveport, Louisiana
Shreveport
Shreveport
1986 establishments in Louisiana